The state superintendent of public instruction (SPI) of California is the nonpartisan (originally partisan) elected executive officer of the California Department of Education. The SPI directs all functions of the Department of Education, executes policies set by the California State Board of Education, and also heads and chairs the Board.  The superintendent is elected to a four-year term, serves as the state’s chief spokesperson for public schools, provides education policy and direction to local school districts, and also serves as an ex officio member of governing boards of the state’s higher education system. The current superintendent of public instruction is Tony Thurmond.

Under Section 2 of Article 9 of the California Constitution, the Superintendent must be directly "elected by the qualified electors of the State at each gubernatorial election." But the State Board of Education is not directly elected, and its members are not appointed by the superintendent. They are appointed by the governor subject to the approval of the state Senate. Therefore, if the governor's party has a majority in the Senate and the governor has different views on state education policy than the superintendent, the governor could put the superintendent in the position of chairing a board of members with opposing views. The California Constitutional Revision Commission proposed that the superintendent should be converted from an elected official into an appointed one, but the Commission's proposal was rejected by the state electorate in 1968.

List of California State Superintendents of Public Instruction

See also 
 G. Vernon Bennett, Los Angeles City Council member, 1935–49, ran for state superintendent of public instruction

References

External links
 

 
1851 establishments in California